The Missa solemnis, WAB 29, is a solemn mass composed by Anton Bruckner in 1854 for the installation of Friedrich Mayer as abbot of St. Florian Abbey on 14 September 1854.

History 
Bruckner composed the Missa solemnis in 1854 for the installation of Friedrich Mayer as abbot of St. Florian Abbey. The Missa solemnis was performed during the installation of Friedrich Mayer on 14 September 1854.
 
After Robert Führer saw the score, he suggested Bruckner study with Simon Sechter, and after seeing the mass, Sechter accepted Bruckner as a pupil. With the possible exception of Psalm 146, the Missa solemnis was the last major work Bruckner wrote before concluding his studies with Sechter, who did not allow his students to compose freely while studying with him.

A second performance of the Missa solemnis occurred two years after Bruckner's death, on 4 May 1898 (Floriani-Tag), in the St. Florian Abbey under the baton of Regens chori Berhard Deubler. On 29 March 1921, the Missa solemnis was performed again by August Göllerich during the seventh concert of the Linzer Bruckner-Stiftung.

Setting 
Bruckner composed the Missa solemnis, WAB 29, as a setting of the mass ordinary for vocal soloists (soprano, alto, tenor and bass), mixed choir, orchestra (2 oboes, 2 bassoons, 2 horns, 2 trumpets, alto, tenor and bass trombones, timpani, and strings) and organ.

According to Catholic practice – as in Bruckner's previous Messe für den Gründonnerstag and his later Mass No. 1 and Mass No. 2 – the first verse of the Gloria and the Credo is intoned by the priest in Gregorian mode before the choir continues. Unlike Bruckner's earlier Choral-Messen, the Gloria and the Credo of the Missa solemnis contain the larger text usually associated with these sections of the Mass.

The setting is divided into six main parts:
 Kyrie – Andante, B minor
 Gloria
 "Et in terra pax..." – Allegro, G minor veering to B major
 "Qui tollis peccata mundi..." – Andante, G minor - bass soloist with solo oboe and choir
 "Quoniam tu solus sanctus..." – Allegro, B major
 Credo
 "Patrem omnipotentem..." – Allegro moderato, B major
 "Et incarnatus est..." – Adagio, F major
 "Et ressurrexit tertia die..." – Allegro, moderato, B major
 "Et vitam venturi saeculi..." – Allegro moderato, B major
 Sanctus – Moderato, B major
 Benedictus – Moderato, E major
 Agnus Dei
 "Agnus Dei..." – Adagio, B major
 "Dona nobis pacem..." – Allegro, B major
Total duration: about 31 minutes.

"Bruckner's Missa Solemnis is a musical summa of the first thirty years of his life." Stylistically the mass, in the line of Beethoven's orchestral masses, displays Bruckner's confrontation with  tradition. In spite of many beautiful details, multiple influences afford the work some heterogeneity in which J. S. Bach's technique of the fugue is "amalgamated" with elements of the Viennese Classical and Preclassical periods, and of the early Romantic (Schubert).

The "Quoniam" quotes from Joseph Haydn's Missa sancti Bernardi von Offida. As in Bruckner's later great masses, the setting of the words "Et resurrexit" is preceded by the "old-fashioned rhetorical gesture" of a "rising chromatic figure in stile agitato representing the trembling of the earth." This rising chromatic figure is repeated before the "Et expecto resurrectionem mortuorum". Several passages of the Missa solemnis, particularly the "Qui tollis" of the Gloria and the central part of the Credo, prefigure Bruckner's next Mass No. 1 in D minor. Both the Gloria and the Credo conclude with a fugue.

Robert Simpson finds "nothing mediocre or tentative about this strong and clear work ... the music is often of excellent quality ... the work, though not perfect, is admirable."

Editions 
The edition by Robert Haas for the Gesamtausgabe was based on the copy given to Mayer. During the 1930s Ferdinand Habel changed the text of bars 28–38 of the Kyrie and bars 57–58 of the Gloria to make the work more usable for Eucharist celebration.

Leopold Nowak rejected these changes in his edition, which also introduced phrasing marks in some violin parts that had not been available to Haas.

Discography 
There are five commercial recordings of the work. The three earlier recordings follow the Haas edition with Habel's text adaptations. Rickenbacker follows the Nowak edition.According to Hans Roelofs, Hausmann's recording (1983) is a remarkable achievement for a non-professional choir. Jürgens performs it with religiosity, as a mass, Rickenbacker more strenuously as a concert work.
The new CD by Borowicz is very welcome. The – at a high level – performance of the Missa solemnis is based on the new Urtext edition by Benjamin Gunnar Cohrs. Moreover, an attempt has been made to partially reconstruct the musical program of the Inauguration Mass for Prelate Friedrich Theophil Mayer, which took place on 14 September1854 in St. Florian.

 Hubert Gunther, Bruckner - Missa Solemnis in B, Rheinische Singgemeinschaft and BRT-Radio Symfonieorkest – LP: Garnet G 40 170, 
 Elmar Hausmann, Anton Bruckner – Missa solemnis in B, Motetten, Chorgemeinschaft and Orchester an der Basilika St. Aposteln Köln – ¨LP: Aulos AUL 53569, 1983 
 Jürgen Jürgens, Anton Bruckner – Music of the St. Florian Period, Monteverdi-Chor and Israel Chamber Orchestra – LP: Jerusalem Records ATD 8503, 1984 (Bruckner Archive Production). Transferred to CD BSVD-0109, 2011
 Karl Anton Rickenbacher, Bruckner - Missa Solemnis, Psalm 112 & Psalm 150, Chor der Bamberger Symphoniker and Bamberger Symphoniker – CD: Virgin Classics VC 7 91481, 1990
 Łukasz Borowicz, RIAS Kammerchor, Akademie für Alte Musik Berlin, Raphael Alpermann (Organ), Anton Bruckner – Missa solemnis –  CD: Accentus ACC 30429, 2017

References

Sources 
Anton Bruckner, Sämtliche Werke, Kritische Gesamtausgabe – Band 15: Requiem d-Moll – Missa solemnis b-Moll, Dr. Benno Filsen Verlag GmbH, Robert Haas (Editor), Augsburg-Vienna, 1930
 Anton Bruckner: Sämtliche Werke: Band XV: Missa Solemnis in B (1854), Musikwissenschaftlicher Verlag der Internationalen Bruckner-Gesellschaft, Leopold Nowak (Editor), Vienna, 1975
 Robert Anderson, "Romantic Mass", The Musical Times 117, No. 1602, 1976
 Uwe Harten, Anton Bruckner. Ein Handbuch. , Salzburg, 1996. .
 Paul Hawkshaw, "Bruckner's large sacred compositions", The Cambridge Companion to Bruckner, John Williamson (Editor), Cambridge University Press, Cambridge, 2004
 A. Crawford Howie, "Bruckner and the motet", The Cambridge Companion to Bruckner edited by John Williamson, Cambridge University Press, Cambridge, 2004
 Keith William Kinder, The Wind and Wind-Chorus Music of Anton Bruckner, Greenwood Press, Westport, Connecticut, 2000
 Hans-Hubert Schönzeler, Bruckner, Marion Boyars, London, 1978
 Robert Simpson, The Essence of Bruckner: An essay towards the understanding of his music, Victor Gollancz Ltd, London, 1967
 Cornelis van Zwol, Anton Bruckner – Leven en Werken, Thot, Bussum (Netherlands), 2012.

External links 
 
 Missa solemnis b-Moll, WAB 29 Critical discography by Hans Roelofs  
 Live performances can be heard on YouTube:
 Ricardo Luna, Karlskirche Wien, 2014: Missa Solemnis in b-Moll - without Credo, with Ave Maria, WAB 5
 Michael Stenov with the Cantores Carmeli, 1 November 2019: Missa Solemnis in B WAB 29

Masses by Anton Bruckner
1854 compositions
Music for orchestra and organ
Compositions in B-flat minor